There are around 130 museums in Paris, France, within city limits. This list also includes suburban museums within the "Grand Paris" area, such as the Air and Space Museum.

The sixteen museums of the City of Paris are annotated with "VP", as well as six other ones also accommodated in municipal premises and the Musées de France (fr) listed by the ministry of culture are annotated with "MF".

List

Paris

Grand Paris

Rest of Île de France

Defunct museums

Paris

Paris région 
 Musée Rosa Bonheur, premises mostly sold by the city in 2014
 Musée d’art naïf de Vicq en Île-de-France, closed in 2014

See also

 List of visitor attractions in Paris
 List of museums in France

Paris
Paris-related lists
Paris